Cazères is a railway station in Cazères, Occitanie, France. The station is on the Toulouse–Bayonne railway. The station is served by TER (local) services operated by the SNCF. The fastest journey time by train from Cazères to Toulouse-Matabiau station is 39 minutes.

Train services
The following services currently call at Cazères:
local service (TER Occitanie) Toulouse–Saint-Gaudens–Tarbes–Pau

References

Railway stations in France opened in 1862
Railway stations in Haute-Garonne